This list of Irish-language given names shows Irish language (Gaeilge) given names and Anglicised or Latinised forms, with English equivalents. Some English-language names derive directly from the Irish: Kathleen = Caitlín, Shaun = Seán. Some Irish-language names derive or are adapted from the English-language: Éamon = Edmund or Edward. Some Irish-language names have direct English equivalents deriving from a common name in Ireland. Máire, Maura and Mary derive from the French "Marie" and the Hebrew "Mary". Maureen = Máirín, a diminutive.

Some Irish names have apparent equivalents in other languages, but they are not etymologically related. Áine (meaning "brightness" or "radiance") is accepted as Anna and Anne (Áine was the name of an Irish Celtic goddess). Some Irish given names may have no equivalent in English (being simply spelt phonetically in an Anglo-Roman way). During the "Irish revival", some Irish names which had fallen out of use were revived. Some names are recent creations, such as the now-common female name "Saoirse", which means "freedom", and "Aisling", meaning vision, dream.

Traditionally and to this day, suffixes may be used to qualify which generation is being referred to. In traditional Irish-language naming, when a father and a son have the same name, Mór (big) and Óg (young) are used to differentiate, meaning in this context "the Elder" and "the Younger" respectively, and this can extend to uncles etc. Examples: Ruaidhrí Mór, Domhnall Óg.

Native

Native feminine names

Native masculine names

Foreign origin

Feminine names of foreign origin

Masculine names of foreign origin

See also
Irish name
List of Scottish Gaelic given names

References
Footnotes

Note: at the time of accessing, the Encyclopedia.com references cited Hanks; Hodges 2006.

Sources

Irish